The Lost Expedition is a 1975 Soviet drama film directed by Venyamin Dorman.

Plot 
The film takes place in 1918. The expedition, consisting of two people engaged in the search for gold deposits, goes to Siberia. Soon local residents join them. Some really want to help them, others pursue selfish goals.

Cast 
 Viktor Sergachyov as Yefim Subbota
 Yevgeniya Simonova as Tasya Smelkova
 Nikolay Gorlov as Usaty
 Nikolai Grinko as the professor, Tasya's father
 Anatoly Kalabulin as Proshka
 Alexander Kaidanovsky as Zimin
 Yuriy Kayurov as Volzhin
 Lev Prygunov as Alexey Kazankov
 Vakhtang Kikabidze as Arsen Georgievich Kabakhidze
 Georgy Martirosyan as episode
 Nikolay Olyalin as gold digger Silantiy
 Radner Muratov as Akhmetka
  Vadim Zakharchenko as  Khariton

References

External links 
 

1975 films
1970s Russian-language films
Soviet drama films
1975 drama films
Films set in 1918
Films set in Siberia
Gorky Film Studio films
1970s adventure films
Soviet adventure films